Milan Albrecht (born 16 July 1950) is a retired Slovak footballer.

During his career he played for Jednota Trenčín, before finishing with Baník Ostrava and Vítkovice. He earned 5 caps for the Czechoslovakia national football team, and participated in the 1970 FIFA World Cup.

Honours

Player
Baník Ostrava
 Czechoslovak First League
 Winners (3): 1975-76, 1979-80, 1980-81

Czechoslovakia
1970 FIFA World Cup: Group Stage

References

External links
 Profile

1950 births
Living people
Slovak footballers
Slovak football managers
Czechoslovak footballers
Czechoslovakia international footballers
Czechoslovakia youth international footballers
1970 FIFA World Cup players
TTS Trenčín players
FC Baník Ostrava players
MFK Vítkovice players
AS Trenčín managers
FC Nitra managers
FC DAC 1904 Dunajská Streda managers
Association football forwards
FK Dukla Banská Bystrica players
Sportspeople from Trenčín